Vinnicombe is a surname. Notable people with the surname include:

Chris Vinnicombe (born 1970), English footballer and manager
Martin Vinnicombe (born 1964), Australian cyclist
Patricia Vinnicombe (1932–2003), South African archaeologist and artist
James Vinnicombe (1998–), Australian comedian